Acanthopagrus berda, the goldsilk seabream, sly bream or picnic seabream, among other names, is a marine fish in the family Sparidae native to the Indian Ocean. Feeding activity intensifies in the summer and is related to temperature and the maximal abundance of benthic organisms. Their diet primarily consists of barnacles, crabs, and oysters, while the secondary food items consist of shrimp, clam and mussels, although the species' diet consists of a wide variety ranging from feeding on teleost, worms, molluscs, small fishes, and plant material.

Distribution 
The goldsilk seabream is found in Indian Ocean. It has been found along the coasts of South Africa, Mozambique, India and in the Red Sea, the Persian Gulf, as well as in Malaysia (Penang Island and Langkawi Island, near Singapore). It is demersal and oceanodromous, and can be found inhabiting marine, freshwater and brackish waters.

References

berd
Fish of the Indian Ocean
Fish described in 1775
Taxa named by Peter Forsskål